Khaled Al-Hazaa  is a Saudi football midfielder who played for Saudi Arabia in the 1992 Asian Cup. He also played for Al Nassr.

References

External links

1971 births
1992 King Fahd Cup players
1992 AFC Asian Cup players
Living people
Al Nassr FC players
Saudi Arabian footballers
Saudi Arabia international footballers
Saudi Professional League players
Association football midfielders